The Crew Cuts were a Canadian vocal quartet, that made a number of popular records that charted in the United States and worldwide. They named themselves after the then popular crew cut haircut, one of the first connections made between pop music and hairstyle. They were most famous for their recording of The Chords' hit record, "Sh-Boom".

Group members
 Rudi Maugeri (né Rudolph Peter Maugeri; January 27, 1931 – May 7, 2004) (lead and baritone)
 John Perkins (born August 28, 1931) (lead and tenor)
 Ray Perkins (born November 24, 1932) (bass) (John Perkins' brother)
 Pat Barrett (September 15, 1933 – July 27, 2016) (lead and tenor)

Biography
They all had been members of the St. Michael's Choir School in Toronto, which also spawned another famous quartet, The Four Lads. Maugeri, John Perkins, and two others (Bernard Toorish and Connie Codarini) who later were among the Four Lads first formed a group called The Jordonaires (not to be confused with a similarly named group, The Jordanaires, that was known for singing backup vocals on Elvis Presley's hits) and also The Otnorots ("Toronto" spelled backwards being "Otnorot"), but they split from the group to finish high school. When the Four Lads returned to Toronto for a homecoming concert, John Perkins and Maugeri ran into each other and decided that they could themselves have a musical future. They joined with Barrett and Ray Perkins in March 1952. The group was originally called The Four Tones (not to be confused with The Four Tunes, a group on the borderline between pop music and rhythm and blues).

A Toronto disk jockey, Barry Nesbitt, put them on his weekly teen show, whose audience gave the group a new name, The Canadaires. All four of the members were at the time working at jobs with the Ontario government, but quit their jobs to sing full-time. They worked clubs in the Niagara Falls, Ontario, and Niagara Falls, New York area, but saved up their money and drove to New York City, so they could appear on Arthur Godfrey's television and radio program, Talent Scouts, where they came in second to a comedian. While they did get a record with Thrillwood Records and recorded a song titled "Chip, Chip Sing A Song Little Sparrow", this led to no improvement in their fortune, however, and they continued playing minor night clubs.

In March 1953, they returned to Toronto and appeared as an opening act for Gisele MacKenzie at the Casino Theatre. She was impressed with them and commented favorably to her record label, but could not remember the group's name.

They were playing in a Sudbury, Ontario, night club in a sub-zero Canadian winter when they received notice that they had been invited to appear as a guest on a Cleveland television program. They drove 600 miles at -40° temperatures to appear on the Gene Carroll show, where they remained for three appearances. While in Cleveland, they met local disc jockey Bill Randle. On his show, on Cleveland radio station WERE (1300 AM), he coined the name that would, from that point on, belong to the group. In addition, Randle arranged for them to audition with Mercury Records, who liked them enough to sign the quartet to a contract.

Although their first hit, "Crazy 'Bout You, Baby", was written by Maugeri and Barrett themselves, they quickly became specialists in cover recordings of originally-R&B songs. Their first cover, "Sh-Boom" (of which the R&B original was recorded by The Chords) hit #1 on the charts in 1954. A number of other hits followed including "Earth Angel" which rose to the number 2 spot on the charts and had great success in the UK and Australia. Many of the non-cover songs of theirs that became hits in Canada were unknown in the United States, while it was only their covers that had great success in the United States.

In the week beginning 19 September 1955, they played six nights at Liverpool Empire, in Liverpool, United Kingdom. A 12 years old George Harrison was among the crowd on one of those nights, and a 13 years old Paul McCartney got an autograph of them.

The group moved from Mercury to RCA Records in 1958 and eventually broke up in 1964, but they all moved to the U.S. and reunited in Nashville, Tennessee, in 1977. In the 1990s they were inducted into the Juno Hall of Fame. In recent years, the three remaining members have appeared on a PBS special filmed in Atlantic City's Trump's Taj Mahal. The program, "Magic Moments: The Best of '50s Pop", continues to air as part of the fund raising efforts for the Public Broadcasting System.

A remix of their version of the song "Sh-Boom" was featured in the credits of the video game Destroy All Humans!. The original recording of their song "Sh-Boom" can  also be heard on one of the in-game radio stations in Mafia II.

In later years, Rudi Maugeri became a music director of one of the music syndication companies, Radio Arts in Burbank, California. The company supplied music on ten inch reels of audiotape for use in radio station automation systems and for "Live Assist" use, around the world. Maugeri selected and issued a playlist every week for the company. His record of picking hit songs for syndication was in the upper 90% and record promoters had Radio Arts on their list of 'must see' companies because Radio Arts provided music to hundreds of stations weekly. Interviewed in 1979 on the syndicated radio show ShBoom Radio Show, Maugeri was quoted, "We came along at a time when the big bands were almost finished and we were the new... and yet we toured with Ralph Marterie's big band as the opening act and were quite well accepted by both the adults and the teens of the day. It wasn't until we hit the charts with "Crazy 'Bout Ya Baby" that the teens adopted us as their own and after that tour we became the headliners."

Discography

Singles

See also

Music of Canada
Canadian rock
Canadian Music Hall of Fame

References

External links
The Crew-Cuts at Doo Wop Heaven
Crew-Cuts page on Black Cat

Musical groups established in 1952
Musical groups disestablished in 1964
Canadian pop music groups
Canadian Music Hall of Fame inductees
Doo-wop groups
Traditional pop music singers
Mercury Records artists
RCA Victor artists
Vee-Jay Records artists
Chess Records artists
Musical groups from Toronto
1952 establishments in Ontario
1964 disestablishments in Ontario